Stefania Rocca (born 24 April 1971) is an Italian actress. She is best known for her roles in the films Nirvana (1997), The Talented Mr. Ripley (1999) and Dracula (2002). Rocca also was the lead in Dario Argento's The Card Player. Among her most recent appearances, she was in Alessandro D'Alatri's comedy film Commediasexi where she played the main character, Pia Roncaldi. She starred as Hannah in the 1997 film Solomon.

Background and personal life
Rocca was born in Turin, the daughter of a Fiat chief of security and a stylist. Beginning in her adolescence Rocca studied piano, singing, and dancing at the Teatro Stabile di Torino. In the late 1980s she moved to Milan where she started working as a model; in Milan she enrolled a series of acting courses. In 1993, thanks to a scholarship, she joined the Centro Sperimentale di Cinematografia in Rome. She also studied at the Actors Studio in New York City.

Rocca is married to her long-time partner Carlo Capasa, whom she wed in a highly secretive ceremony in 2013. The couple has been together since 2005, and has two sons.

Career
Rocca made her acting debut with a secondary role in Giulio Base's Policemen but her breakout role was the blue haired Naima in the Gabriele Salvatores' cyberpunk film Nirvana (1997). After enrolling a course at the Actors Studio in New York, in 1998, Rocca had her first main role in the controversial erotic thriller Viol@, and for her performance she was nominated to the Nastro d'Argento for Best Actress. One year later, Rocca appeared in Anthony Minghella's The Talented Mr. Ripley as  Jude Law's lover, then she appeared in other international productions, including Kenneth Branagh's Love's Labour's Lost, Mike Figgis' experimental Hotel and Tom Tykwer's Heaven.

In 2003, Rocca had her main commercial success in Italy, with Alessandro D'Alatri's comedy Casomai, which also gave her a nomination for Best Actress at the Nastro d'Argento and David di Donatello Awards. In 2005, she played a blind lesbian in the Academy Award-nominated drama The Beast in the Heart, and for her performance, she was nominated for the David di Donatello for Best Supporting Actress. Since the mid-2000s, Rocca has mainly appeared on television. She is also active on stage.

Filmography

Film

Television

References

External links

 

1971 births
Living people
Actors from Turin
Italian film actresses
Italian television actresses
Italian stage actresses
Centro Sperimentale di Cinematografia alumni
Actors Studio alumni
Ciak d'oro winners